The 2nd Mechanized Battalion "Pumas" is the largest of two mechanized infantry battalions within the Guards Armoured Mechanized Brigade (GOMBR) of the Croatian Army.

History 
Established in its current form following the reorganisation of the Croatian Armed Forces, the 2nd Mechanized Battalion "Pume" was created with the amalgamation Croatia's wartime 7th Guards Brigade "Pumas" and 2nd Guards Brigade "Thunders" in 2007. 

Initially garrisoned at the 132nd Brigade barracks in Našice in eastern Croatia, following the consolidation of the 7th and 2nd Guard Brigades, in 2018 the battalion returned to a newly built garrison in Varaždin, Northern Croatia named in honour of the 7th Guards Brigade "Pumas".

Organization 
The battalion comprises three mechanized companies, a command company, a logistics company and a fire support company, making it highly mobile and self-sufficient.

References 

Military units and formations of Croatia